David Teague is the name of:

 David Teague (basketball) (born 1983), American collegiate basketball player
 David Teague (footballer) (born 1981), Australian rules football player and coach